Libaya reigned as king of Assyria  1690–1674 BC. He succeeded Bel-bani in the Adaside dynasty, which came to the fore after the ejection of the Babylonians and Amorites from Assyria.

Little is known of his reign, however Assyria was known to have been a relatively peaceful, secure and stable nation during this period.

References

Georges Roux - Ancient Iraq
K. R. Veenhof (2008). Mesopotamia: The Old Assyrian Period. Vandenhoeck & Ruprecht. p. 24.

17th-century BC Assyrian kings